Hermann Schmitz (1 January 1881 – 8 October 1960) was a German industrialist and Nazi war criminal. CEO of IG Farben from 1935 to 1945, he was sentenced to four years in prison in the IG Farben Trial.

Biography
Schmitz was born in Essen on 1 January 1881, son of factory worker Diedrich Schmitz and Luise Wöhrmann. In 1898 he began studying at Ahrenbergische Aktiengesellschaft für Bergbau und Hüttenbetrieb in Hessen, and in 1905 he entered the Commerce College in Nuremberg. After completing his studies, he was hired by Metallurgische Gesellschaft (metallurgy company), where after some time he became consultant of Wilhelm Merton, member of the supervisors' council of the company, who helped Schmitz promote his career.

In 1914 he was required to serve in the army. He was injured during the First World War and, after recovering from his injuries, he was made Reich's supervisor for chemical products production in the matériel department (1915).

In 1919, as an expert in fertilizers and nitric salts, he took part in the assembly that negotiated the Treaty of Versailles. There he met Carl Bosch, a chemist of worldwide fame. In July 1919 Schmitz was hired at BASF by Bosch as his financial advisor. He was promoted to administrator of BASF's exterior department, a position he maintained after the company became part of IG Farben. As per his job requirements he maintained contacts with large businesses, such as Standard Oil, with which he took part in negotiations, always having the support of that era's governments in the interests of IG Farben.

War crimes 
In 1933, he was elected to the Reichstag under the administration of the Nazi Party and after two years, he succeeded Carl Bosch as IG Farben's CEO. In 1938, he became war economy administrator (Wehrwirtschaftsführer). In 1941, Hitler gave him a portrait of him with his autograph as a gift for his dedication to the aims of Nazi Germany. Schmitz led IG Farben until the end of the Second World War. He was arrested and charged at the IG Farben Trial, during which he was sentenced to four years imprisonment (including time already served) for war crimes and crimes against humanity through the plundering and spoliation of occupied territories. He was released in 1950 and went on to become member of the administrators' council of Deutsche Bank in Berlin, as well as the honorary president of "Rheinische Stahlwerke AG".

Schmitz died in Heidelberg on 8 October 1960.

Sources 
 Wollheim Memorial
 Jewish Virtual Library
 Online Academy: Profit over life
 
Higham, Charles (1983) Trading with the Enemy; An exposé of the Nazi – American Money Plot 1933–1949. Robert Hale, London. Chapter 8 'The Film Conspiracy'

References

External links 
 

1881 births
1960 deaths
Businesspeople from Essen
20th-century German businesspeople
IG Farben people
German industrialists
German chemical industry people
People convicted by the United States Nuremberg Military Tribunals
German people convicted of crimes against humanity
Members of the Reichstag of Nazi Germany
German Army personnel of World War I